This is a list of lighthouses in Germany.

List

See also 
 Lists of lighthouses and lightvessels

References

External links 

 

 
Germany
Lighthouses
Lighthouses